The 4th Hong Kong Awards ceremony, honored the best films of 1984 and took place on 13 April 1985, at the Furama Hong Kong Hotel, Hong Kong. The ceremony was hosted by Winnie Yu, during the ceremony awards are presented in 14 categories. The ceremony was sponsored by City Entertainment Magazine.

Awards
Winners are listed first, highlighted in boldface, and indicated with a double dagger.

References

External links
 Official website of the Hong Kong Film Awards

1985
Hong Kong
1985 in Hong Kong